Ciguayo (Siwayo) was the language of the Samaná Peninsula of Hispaniola (now the Dominican Republic) at the time of the Spanish Conquest. The Ciguayos appear to have predated the agricultural Taino who inhabited much of the island. The language appears to have been moribund at the time of Spanish contact, and within a century it was extinct.

Ciguayo was spoken on the northeastern coast of the Roman Catholic Diocese of Magua from Nagua southward to at least the Yuna River, and throughout all of the Samana Peninsula.

Lexicon
Little is known of Ciguayo apart from it being a distinct language from Taino and neighboring Macorix. The only attested words are "gold", tuob (presumably  or ) and a few place names such as Quizquella (presumably ), meaning "very mountainous." This makes it unlikely that the language is Arawakan or Cariban, as languages of those families have simple V and CV syllable structures even in loanwords that were originally CCV or CVC. Granberry & Vescelius (2004) speculate that the closest parallels might be in the Tolan languages of Honduras.

Granberry & Vescelius (2004) analyze the morphemes of tuob 'gold' and Quizquella 'very mountainous' as:

to-w-b(e) 'gold'
to- (cf. Eastern Tol t 'heavy(ness)')
-w- (cf. Eastern Tol -w- 'its')
-b(e) (cf. Eastern Tol -pe 'stone')

kʰis-kʰe-ya 'very mountainous'
kʰis- (cf. Eastern Tol kʰis 'hard rock')
-kʰe- (cf. reduplication in Eastern Tol)
-ya (cf. Eastern Tol yo 'tree')

See also
Pre-Arawakan languages of the Greater Antilles

References

Languages of the Dominican Republic
Pre-Arawakan languages of the Greater Antilles
Extinct languages of North America
Languages extinct in the 16th century